Manny Cruz (born 1993/1994) is a current member of the Massachusetts House of Representatives for the 7th Essex District.

Career 
Starting in 2017, Cruz worked as a Legislative Aide to State Representative Juana Matias. He was also elected as a member of the Salem School Committee in the same year. He was also a part of Paul F. Tucker's office. He was elected as the Representative for the 7th Essex District of the Massachusetts House of Representatives in 2022.

Personal life 
Cruz married Vanessa Cruz in 2019. The couple have one daughter.

References 

Democratic Party members of the Massachusetts House of Representatives
21st-century American politicians
Hispanic and Latino American state legislators in Massachusetts
Living people
Northeastern University alumni
1990s births